Tetsuya Kijima (born August 20, 1983) is a Japanese football player for Kamatamare Sanuki.

Career
His elder brother Ryosuke is also a professional footballer.

Club statistics
Updated to 23 February 2018.

References

External links
Profile at Kamatamare Sanuki

1983 births
Living people
Association football people from Chiba Prefecture
Japanese footballers
J2 League players
J3 League players
Japan Football League players
Sagawa Shiga FC players
Blaublitz Akita players
FC Gifu players
MIO Biwako Shiga players
Matsumoto Yamaga FC players
FC Machida Zelvia players
Kamatamare Sanuki players
Association football forwards